Ernest Vincze (born 1942 in Budapest, Hungary) is a film and television cinematographer.

Among his credits are the 1986 film Biggles, the television movie Escape from Sobibor and the Sean Penn and Madonna vehicle Shanghai Surprise. In 2005 he became the director of photography on the new series of Doctor Who, photographing the entire first series. He returned for the second series, in its first, third and fifth production blocks (Blocks Two, Four and Six were helmed by Rory Taylor).

References

External links

1942 births
Hungarian cinematographers
Living people